This is a list of characters from the Syfy original series Eureka.

Overview

Main characters

Supporting characters

Guest stars
 Ming-Na Wen as U.S. Senator Michaela Wen (7 episodes, 2011-2012)  
 Wallace Shawn as Dr. Warren Hughes (3 episodes, 2011-2012)
 Olivia d'Abo as Dr. Abby Carter (2 episodes, 2007) 
 Jennifer Clement as Susan Perkins (2 episodes, 2006) 
 Michael Brock as Jasper Cole (2 episodes, 2007) 
 Benjamin Ratner as Dr. Fung (2 episodes, 2011-2012) 
 Greg Germann as Professor Warren King (1 episode, 2006) 
 Billy Campbell as Dr. Bruce Manlius (1 episode, 2009) 
 Allison Scagliotti as Claudia Donovan (1 episode, 2010 - Warehouse 13 crossover) 
 Stan Lee as Dr. "Generalissimo" Lee (1 episode, 2011) 
 Dondré Whitfield as Dr. Marcus Blake (1 episode, 2012) 
 Teryl Rothery as Diane Lancaster (1 episode, 2007) 
 Alan Ruck as Dr. Hood (1 episode, 2008) 
 Eugene Byrd as Dr. Michael Clark (1 episode, 2012) 
 Saul Rubinek as Dr. Carl Carlson (1 episode, 2006) 
Rubinek is a main cast member of Warehouse 13 but appears here as a different character much like Erica Cerra and Niall Matter did in Warehouse 13.
 Michael Shanks as Christopher Dactylos (1 episode, 2007) 
 Jim Parsons as the voice of Carl the Jeep (1 episode, 2011) 
 Mark Hildreth as Chuck (1 episode, 2008) 
 Jay Brazeau as Captain Yuri Gregor (1 episode, 2009) 
 Garry Chalk as Colonel Briggs (1 episode, 2006) 
 Richard Ian Cox as Dr. Bob Stone (1 episode, 2007) 
 John DeSantis as Big Ed (1 episode, 2009) 
 Jamie Kennedy as Dr. Ramsey (1 episode, 2010) 
 David Paetkau as Callister Raynes (1 episode, 2006)
 Keegan Connor Tracy as Dr. Viccelli (1 episode, 2010)

References

External links
Eureka Characters at IMDB

Science fiction characters
Lists of fictional characters
Characters